Victor Cobăsneanu (born 9 December 1960, in Cuizăuca) is a journalist from Soroca, Republic of Moldova. He has been the editor in chief of Observatorul de Nord in Soroca since 1988. Also, he is an editorialist of Vocea Basarabiei.

Biography 

Victor Cobăsneanu graduated from Ion Creangă Pedagogical State University in 1986 and worked as correspondent for  Moldpres, correspondent for  „Nezavisimaia Moldova” and adviser of the prefect of Soroca. He is a member of the Union of Journalists of Moldova.

Awards
 "Best reporter in the Independent Press Association”.
 Prize “Gold Cup for Prestigious Business”, of the newspaper "Actualidad", Spain

References

External links 
 Radio Free Europe, „Nici tu ploaie ca lumea, nici tu limpezirea apelor în domeniul politicii”
 Reporter european

1960 births
Living people
People from Rezina District
Moldovan journalists
Male journalists
Popular Front of Moldova politicians
Euronova Media Group